Jowler Creek is a stream in Platte County in the U.S. state of Missouri.

Jowler Creek most likely was named after a local citizen, although tradition states the name was selected on account of pork jowls being discharged into the creek as slaughter waste.

References

Rivers of Platte County, Missouri
Rivers of Missouri